Kazuki Minami (born 24 January 2000) is a Japanese artistic gymnast. He turned senior in 2019 and became the 2019 World Cup gold medalist on Floor Exercise at Cottbus and Paris. At the 2021 World Artistic Gymnastics Championships he qualified for the floor exercise final in third place. In the final he took home the silver medal.

Competitive history

References 

Living people
2000 births
Japanese male artistic gymnasts
Sportspeople from Yamaguchi Prefecture
Medalists at the World Artistic Gymnastics Championships
21st-century Japanese people